H. fenestrata may refer to:
 Hecatesia fenestrata, Boisduval, 1829, a moth species in the genus Hecatesia
 Hexatoma fenestrata, Brunetti, 1911, a crane fly species in the genus Hexatoma
 Hysterostegiella fenestrata, a fungus species

See also
 Fenestrata (disambiguation)